McNeice is a surname. Notable people with the surname include:

Ian McNeice (born 1950), English actor
John A. McNeice Jr (born 1940), American philanthropist
Roger McNeice, Australian numismatist, historian and coin collector
Vince McNeice (born 1938), English footballer and manager

See also:
John MacNeice (1866-1942), Church of Ireland bishop, father of the poet Louis
Louis MacNeice (1907-1963, poet and playwright, born in Northern Ireland